Dalian Professional Football Club is a professional Chinese football club based in Dalian, Liaoning, that participates in the China Super League under licence from the Chinese Football Association (CFA). Their home stadium is Dalian Sports Centre Stadium with a capacity of 61,000.

The club was refounded on September 20, 2009, by Dalian Aerbin Group Company, Ltd., and started from the third tier of the Chinese football pyramid, the China League Two. Winning two consecutive league titles in the second and third tier professional football leagues, they were promoted to the top tier in 2012 Chinese Super League season where they experienced their highest ever placing of fifth in the same season. In 2014, they were relegated from the Chinese Super League.  In December 2015, they were renamed Dalian Yifang Football Club. In October 2017, they won the Chinese League One championship and successfully upgraded. On May 25, 2019, Dalian Yifang Football Club was renamed Dalian Professional Football Club, with new logo unveiled on January 21, 2020.

History

Club history

Dalian Aerbin (2009–2014)

On September 20, 2009, Dalian Aerbin Group Co. Ltd. established a new professional football club named Dalian Aerbin and hired former Chinese footballer Li Ming to become the club manager. The club's name Aerbin comes from the Manchu language meaning a place with water, which is also the name of a small town in Jinzhou District of Dalian where Dalian Aerbin Group Co. Ltd is located. They would soon move into the Dalian University Stadium in the Dalian Development Area and bring in Chi Shangbin as their co-manager and Sun Xianlu as their Head coach. Starting in the third tier league, the club made their debut in 2010 China League Two season.  The club brought in established top tier Chinese Super League players such as Guo Hui, Chang Lin and Yang Lin. The quality of these players helped the club win their regional division section and later the league title over Tianjin Songjiang as the club won the championship.

In the following season, the club hired its first foreign coach, Bulgarian manager Aleksandar Stankov. Dalian Aerbin F.C. set up a surprising winning streak and won the 2011 China League One championship. With their meteoric rise to the Super League, the club decided to use the 30,775 seater Jinzhou Stadium as its home stadium and shared it with their local rival Dalian Shide as well as signing a more experienced manager in Chang Woe-Ryong who had previously managed in the Chinese Super League with Qingdao Jonoon. The club initially struggled in the league and the club brought in Aleksandar Stanojević as the head coach. By July 11, 2012 Dalian Aerbin brought in a marquee player in former Barcelona F.C. midfielder Seydou Keita who departed the Spanish team on a free transfer and helped ensure Dalian Aerbin remain within the league. At the end of the 2012 league season Stanojevć managed to not only avoid relegation but actually guided the club to fifth within the league.

On 30 November 2012, Aerbin Group acquired the local rival Dalian Shide F.C. by taking on responsibility of their 330 million RMB debt after Dalian Shide's chairman Xu Ming was arrested for bribing and corruption. In hopes of bringing in a harmonious merger of the two teams, former Dalian Shide manager Xu Hong was brought in for the start of the 2013 Chinese Super League. However, after only 63 days in charge he had to resign after the Chinese Football Association found that he manipulated a match while as a manager at Sichuan First City and was given a 5-year suspension from all football activity, which forced Li Ming to start the season as their caretaker manager. Chinese Football Association called off this merger according to regulations, and decided that former Dalian Shide players should join the free market, while Dalian Aerbin could only sign them through normal transfer, 5 at most, instead of taking over the whole team. This incident caused Aerbin to face some serious financial problems, being unable to pay the salaries, bonuses, or even maintenance of the stadium. At the end of 2014 Chinese Super League, Aerbin was relegated to China League One.

Dalian Yifang (2015–2019)

With Dalian Aerbin back in the China League One division and with the loss of revenue generated from being in the top tier the club could not afford to maintain their squad, which saw a mass exodus of players. Mikael Stahre was hired as the Head coach at the start of the 2015 league campaign and looked to be pushing for promotion, which saw Dalian Yifang Group Co. Ltd on 8 July 2015 buy majority shares within the club. The purchase was promoted by Wang Jianlin and his Dalian Wanda Group who are a main shareholder of the Yifang Group (一方, "one region"), with the investment signalling a return of football ownership from Wang Jianlin who had previously owned Dalian Wanda F.C. The club failed to win promotion back into the top tier after finishing third place at the end of the 2015 season and officially changed their name to Dalian Yifang F.C. in December 2015. On 10 July 2015 in a press conference to confirm the Yifang Group's investment, the general manager Shi Xueqing admitted that the club was still losing money.

In the 2017 China League One season Dalian Yifang won the division title and promotion back into the top tier under Head coach Juan Ramón López Caro. Despite this success the Dalian Football Association announced he was replaced by Ma Lin, which saw speculation grow that the club were still in financial difficulties and were looking for the local government Dalian Sports Bureau to takeover the club. On 20 February 2018 the Wanda Group took full control on the club after selling their 17% share in Atlético Madrid to Israeli businessman Idan Ofer on 14 February 2018. The Wanda Group would use the money taken from Atlético Madrid and invest it in bringing in Argentinian international Nicolás Gaitán and Belgium international Yannick Carrasco.

The team and the Wanda Group sought further influence in the 2019 season. In February 2019, the club completed another marquee signing from Europe, this time acquiring the services of Napoli man Marek Hamšík, who signed for a reported fee of about €20 million (£18m/$23m). Gaitán left the team to play for the MLS side Chicago Fire after just one season. The team signed with Korean manager Choi Kang-hee, but had less-than-expected performance as the league went halfways. In July 2019, Dalian Pro ended contract with Choi, while Rafael Benítez was introduced to the team, that he "was impressed by chairman Wang's passion and future plan on football". Salomon Rondon also joined from Newcastle United, as a response to Benítez's call.

Dalian Professional (2020–present)
On 21 January 2020, Dalian Yifang changed their name to Dalian Professional. Due to the COVID-19 pandemic, the 2020 Chinese Super League did not start until July, after when Carrasco decided to leave the team. Dalian Pro and Benitez focused on aggressive promotion of young players, putting older players down to the reserves, as the 2020 league do not have much relegation pressure.

In January 2021, Benítez and Dalian Pro parted ways. Hamsik and Rondon also decided to leave. As the CSL introduced further limit on salary cap and transfer fees, the team seems to reach a post-marquee era, by not introducing new foreign players, and remained low-profile. The team appointed José González, but relegated to China League One after the season.

On 12 March 2022, Dalian Pro announced major changes in its owners. Wanda Group decided to quit, and the team would be taken over temporarily by a government-led reforming work team. Past debts and operating costs of the first team, youth training facilities and projects for the next three years would still be covered by Wanda Group. The Dalian Pro Academy Base was donated to DETA Holdings, a state-invested company in Dalian.

On 27 May 2022, the Chinese Football Association (CFA) announced that Dalian Pro, who had been relegated from the top flight at the end of last season, would compete in the 18-team top flight, as a replacement for disbanded club Chongqing Liangjiang Athletic.

Ownership and naming history

Current squad

First team

Reserve squad
As of 1 March 2019

Unregistered players

Coaching staff
As of 16 May 2022.

Managerial history

Honours
 China League One (Second Tier League)
Winners (2): 2011, 2017
 China League Two (Third Tier League)
Winners (1): 2010

Results 
All-time League Rankings

 As of the end of 2021 season

  in group stage
  in group stage. 
  the 2020 Chinese Super League was held behind closed doors most of the time, attendance and stadium not applicable.
  the 2021 Chinese Super League was held behind closed doors most of the time, attendance and stadium not applicable.
 Key
<div>

 Pld = Played
 W = Games won
 D = Games drawn
 L = Games lost
 F = Goals for
 A = Goals against
 Pts = Points
 Pos = Final position

 DNQ = Did not qualify
 DNE = Did not enter
 NH = Not Held
- = Does Not Exist
 R1 = Round 1
 R2 = Round 2
 R3 = Round 3
 R4 = Round 4

 F = Final
 SF = Semi-finals
 QF = Quarter-finals
 R16 = Round of 16
 Group = Group stage
 GS2 = Second Group stage
 QR1 = First Qualifying Round
 QR2 = Second Qualifying Round
 QR3 = Third Qualifying Round

Past and present internationals
Had international caps for their respective countries.

China
 Chen Lei (2012–2013)
 Chen Tao (2013–2015)
 Dong Xuesheng (2012–2013)
 He Yupeng (2019–present)
 Hu Zhaojun (2011–2012)
 Huang Jiahui (2019–present)
 Li Xuepeng (2013–2014)
 Liu Yu (2012–2013)
 Lü Peng (2013–2014, 2022–present)
 Li Shuai (2016–2021)
 Qin Sheng (2018–2019)
 Tong Lei (2022–present)
 Wang Jinxian (2014–2021)
 Wang Wanpeng (2015–2018)
 Yang Lin (2010–2012)
 Yang Shanping (2018–2019)
 Yan Xiangchuang (2022–present)
 Yu Dabao (2012–2014)
 Yu Hanchao (2013–2014)
 Zhang Jiaqi (2014)
 Zhao Mingjian (2019)
 Zhao Xuri (2019–2021)
 Zheng Long (2019–2021)
 Zhou Ting (2017–2020)
 Zhu Ting (2015–2020, 2022–present)

Africa
 Almami Moreira (2011)
 Lee Addy (2012)
 Seydou Keita (2012–2013)
 Peter Utaka (2012–2013)
 Nabil Baha (2013)
 Mohamed Bangura (2016)
 Nyasha Mushekwi (2016–2019)
 Sekou Oliseh (2016)
 Emmanuel Boateng (2019–2021)
Asia
 Daniel Mullen (2012–2013)
 Mile Sterjovski (2012)
 Nashat Akram (2014)
 Alex Akande (2019-2020)
 Vas Nuñez (2022-)

Europe
 Kiril Kotev (2011)
 Guillaume Hoarau (2013)
 Leon Benko (2014)
 Niklas Backman (2014–2015)
 Constantin Budescu (2016)
 Mathias Ranégie (2016)
 José Fonte (2018)
 Yannick Carrasco (2018–2019)
 Marek Hamšík (2019–2020)
 Sam Larsson (2020–2021)
 Marcus Danielson (2020–2021)
 Borislav Tsonev (2022–)

South America
 Fábio Rochemback (2012–2013)
 Gustavo Canales (2012)
 Nicolás Gaitán (2018–2019)
 Salomón Rondón (2019–2020)

References

External links

Official website 

Dalian Professional F.C.
Chinese Super League clubs
Association football clubs established in 1983
Sport in Dalian
1983 establishments in China
Football clubs in Liaoning